is a 2014 Japanese romance film directed by Naomi Kawase. It was selected to compete for the Palme d'Or in the main competition section at the 2014 Cannes Film Festival. It was screened in the Contemporary World Cinema section at the 2014 Toronto International Film Festival.

Kawase has described the film as her "masterpiece", deserving of the Palme d'Or and states: "This is the first time that I have said this about a film.  After the Camera d'Or and the Grand Prix, there is nothing I want more than the Palme d'Or. I have my eyes on nothing else."

The film was taken in the scenic nature of Amami City, Amami Ōshima, in Kagoshima Prefecture, Japan in 2013. The music was produced by Hasiken, a male singer-songwriter from Chichibu, Saitama.

Cast

 Nijirō Murakami
 Jun Yoshinaga
 Tetta Sugimoto
 Miyuki Matsuda
 Makiko Watanabe
 Jun Murakami
 Hideo Sakaki
 Fujio Tokita
 Faith eledia

Reception
Reviewing it at Cannes, Nikola Grozdanovic at Indiewire gave it a B+, stating that "'Still The Water' is a spectacle for the senses, which, if there is any justice, will be remembered as one of the greater films of the competition." In The Guardian, Peter Bradshaw gave it 3 out of 5 stars and stated, "Kawase's film is sometimes beautiful and moving but I couldn't help occasionally finding it a little contrived and self-conscious." In Film Business Asia, Derek Elley gave the film a rating of 2 out of 10, calling it "more empty, pretentious ramblings from self-styled auteur Kawase Naomi".

References

External links
 (in Japanese)
 

2014 films
2014 romance films
Japanese romance films
2010s Japanese-language films
Films directed by Naomi Kawase
2010s Japanese films